Kinnear is a Scottish and Irish surname which means "chieftain". Notable persons with that name include:
 A. E. Kinnear, Australian Secretary to the Public Service Commissioner
 Andrew Kinnear (1750–1818), Canadian politician
 Ben Kinnear (born 1979), footballer
 Bob Kinnear, Canadian labour leader
 Charles Kinnear (1830–1894), architect
 David Kinnear (1917–2008), Scottish association football player
 David Kinnear (journalist) ( 1906–1862), Canadian journalist
 Dominic Kinnear (born 1967), Scottish-American association football player and manager
 George Kinnear (1836–1912), American military officer and real estate developer
 Greg Kinnear (born 1963), American actor
 Kent Kinnear (born 1966), American tennis player
 Helen Kinnear (1894–1970), Canadian lawyer
 Joe Kinnear (1912–1981), Australian rules footballer
 Joe Kinnear (born 1946), Irish association football player and manager
 John Kinnear (Irish politician) (1824–1894), Irish politician
 John Boyd Kinnear (1828–1920), Scottish lawyer, writer and politician
 Mary Elizabeth Kinnear (1898–1991), Canadian politician
 Norman Boyd Kinnear (1882–1957), Scottish zoologist
 Roy Kinnear (1934–1988), English actor
 Rory Kinnear (born 1978), English actor, son of Roy Kinnear
 Wally Kinnear (1880–1974), Scottish rower

See also
 Kinnear Mountains, a range of mountains in Antarctica
 Kinnear, Wyoming, an unincorporated community

References

Surnames of Scottish origin